morison/opit was the authorial name given to the collaboration between composers Benjamin Morison and Simon Opit.

Project 
Benjamin Morison and Simon Opit and were composers who worked exclusively in collaboration for a period of some years, approximately 1991–1994. As one commentator wrote, "Much of their work consists of two set of parts written independently, which adds a new radical sense of indeterminacy one might have thought lost in recent works of the experimentalist genre."

In a text published in 1992, they wrote:

Critical reception 

The BBC broadcast several works by morison/opit.

Two concerts featuring their music were reviewed in Tempo magazine.

List of works 

Based on the list of works published in Farben '92, expanded from various other sources.

 long and soft bowing (1991), for bowed vibraphone and string quartet
 sew the blue sail (1991)
 double arrangement (1992), for piano & 'cello and violin & vibraphone
 II - flute, piano, violin, viola, 'cello (1992): broadcast Fri 21st Jul 1995, 22:25 on BBC Radio 3
 III - large ensemble (1992)
 one piano (1992): written for Nicolas Hodges and broadcast by him Sun 19th Feb 1995, 20:45 on BBC Radio 3 
 touching the piano (1992), one trombone (1992)
 violin, viola, cello (1993)
 violins and viola (1993)
 IV - Mixed ensemble (1993), for 2 violins and viola, and trombone and cello
 one viola (1993)
 sound river (1993)
 I992 (1993) for organ
 V - voices, cello (1994)
 VI - violins and ensemble (1993-4)
 VII - piano quartet (1994)
 VIII - piano and string quartet (1988/1994): broadcast Fri 21st Jul 1995, 22:25 on BBC Radio 3
 X - string quartet (1994): commissioned by BBC Radio 3

Bibliography 
 morison/opit, List of works, Farben '92, London: Orchid Music, 1992, edited by Edward Dudley Hughes, p. 17
 morison/opit, double arrangement (text), Farben '92, London: Orchid Music, 1992, edited by Edward Dudley Hughes, p. 13-16
 morison/opit, double arrangement (score of composition), Farben '92, London: Orchid Music, 1992, edited by Edward Dudley Hughes, p. 18-32
 Laurence Hughes, Ixion, Purcell Room, 21 February 1993, Tempo, New Series, No. 185 (Jun., 1993), p. 33
 Ian Pace, Etcetra Ensemble, Tempo, New Series, No. 188 (Mar., 1994), p. 58

References 

20th-century classical composers
English classical composers
English experimental musicians
Australian classical composers
Australian experimental musicians
Living people
English male classical composers
20th-century English composers
20th-century British male musicians
Australian male classical composers
20th-century Australian male musicians
20th-century Australian musicians
Year of birth missing (living people)